Éole was a second rank two-decker ship of the line of the French Royal Navy. She was armed with 64 guns, comprising twenty-four 24-pounder guns on the lower deck and twenty-six 12-pounder guns on the upper deck, with eight 6-pounder guns on the quarterdeck and six 6-pounder guns on the forecastle.

Designed by Joseph Andrault, Marquis de Langeron, and built by Pierre Chaillé, she was begun at Le Havre in July 1692 as one of the replacements for the ships destroyed by an English attack at La Hougue in June 1692. She was launched in February 1693 and completed in May 1693.

Éole, along with her sister ship , took part in the Battle of Vélez-Málaga on 24 August 1704 and was subsequently scuttled at Toulon in July 1707, but was later raised. She was sold in 1710 to be taken to pieces.

Notes and citations

References
 
 Nomenclature des Vaisseaux du Roi-Soleil de 1661 a 1715. Alain Demerliac (Editions Omega, Nice – various dates).
 The Sun King's Vessels (2015) - Jean-Claude Lemineur; English translation by François Fougerat. Editions ANCRE.  
 Winfield, Rif and Roberts, Stephen (2017) French Warships in the Age of Sail 1626-1786: Design, Construction, Careers and Fates. Seaforth Publishing. .

Ships of the line of the French Navy
1690s ships
Ships built in France